Sudapak Operating Company is a petroleum company operating in Sudan.  It is affiliated with Zaver Petroleum of Pakistan and is currently active in oil and gas exploration, in association with Sudapet, the national oil company of Sudan.  Sudapak is based in Khartoum.

External links
USGS 2005 Minerals Yearbook:Sudan also available as HTML, please Google "sudapak industries"
Sudapak company profile at Manta.com
Zaver Petroleum official site

Oil and gas companies of Sudan
Companies based in Khartoum